The 2014–15 Nicholls State Colonels men's basketball team represented Nicholls State University during the 2014–15 NCAA Division I men's basketball season. The Colonels, led by eleventh year head coach J. P. Piper, played their home games at Stopher Gym and are members of the Southland Conference.

The Colonels were picked to finish eighth (8th) in both the Southland Conference Coaches' Poll and the Sports Information Directors Poll.

The Colonels were the sixth seed in the 2015 Southland Conference tournament due to ineligibility of three teams which finished higher in conference play.  In the first game of the tournament, the Colonels played the seventh seeded New Orleans Privateers losing 73–82.  The Colonels finished the season with a 10–19 overall record and a 7–11 record in conference play tied for eighth place.

Roster
ֶ

Schedule
Source 

|-
!colspan=9 style="background:#FF0000; color:#808080;"|  Exhibition

|-
!colspan=9 style="background:#FF0000; color:#808080;"|  Out of Conference

|-
!colspan=9 style="background:#FF0000; color:#808080;"|  Conference Games

|-
!colspan=9 style="background:#FF0000; color:#808080;"| Southland tournament

See also
2014–15 Nicholls State Colonels women's basketball team

References

Nicholls Colonels men's basketball seasons
Nicholls State
2014 in sports in Louisiana
2015 in sports in Louisiana